Albert Sonnichsen (May 5, 1878, San Francisco, California- August 16, 1931, Willimantic, Connecticut) was an American journalist, author and adventurer.

Biography 
Albert's father, Nicholas Sonnichsen had fought with the Confederate Army during the American Civil War and, like his son later, was captured and held as a POW. As young boy Albert ran from home and traveled around the world. In 1898 he went to the Philippines as American soldier during the Spanish–American War. He was captured and held in captivity for more than ten months. In 1905 he traveled to the Balkans. During 1906, he arrived in the Ottoman Empire. Sonnichsen joined the IMRO Bulgarian revolutionaries at their struggle against the Greeks and the Turks.

Sonnichsen married Natalie de Bogory (1887–1939), who is primarily known for her work in translating from the Russian language into the English language, and subsequently distributing and participating in having published the first or second American edition in the United States of the document known as the Protocols of the Elders of Zion. They had one child Eric in 1909, but were divorced in 1919.

Later Sonnichsen was organizer of the Cooperative movement in the USA. In 1920 he settled in Connecticut and managed his own farm. He died in 1931, at age of 53.

References

Bibliography 
 Ten months a captive among Filipinos (1901) 
 Deep Sea Vagabonds (1903) 
 The Secret Republic of Macedonia. (1904).
 Confessions of a Macedonian Bandit. (1909).
 Consumers' Cooperation (1919)

1878 births
1931 deaths
People from San Francisco
Journalists from California
Members of the Internal Macedonian Revolutionary Organization
Bulgarian revolutionaries